William Brown Maclay (March 20, 1812 – February 19, 1882) was an American newspaperman, lawyer, and politician who served five terms as a United States representative from New York from 1843 to 1849, and from 1857 to 1861.

Biography 
Born in New York City, he received private instruction and was graduated from the College of the City of New York in 1836. He was associate editor of the New York Quarterly Review in 1836, taught Latin, studied law, was admitted to the bar in 1839 and commenced the practice of his profession in New York City.

Political career 
He was a member of the New York State Assembly from 1840 to 1842.

Congress 
He was elected as a Democrat to the Twenty-eighth, Twenty-ninth, and Thirtieth Congresses, holding office from March 4, 1843 to March 3, 1849. He was an unsuccessful candidate for reelection in 1848 to the Thirty-first Congress, and was elected to the Thirty-fifth and Thirty-sixth Congresses, holding office from March 4, 1857 to March 4, 1861. He was not a candidate for reelection in 1860 to the Thirty-seventh Congress.

Death 
He in 1882 died in New York City. Interment was in Green-Wood Cemetery, Brooklyn.

References

1812 births
1882 deaths
Democratic Party members of the New York State Assembly
Burials at Green-Wood Cemetery
City College of New York alumni
Democratic Party members of the United States House of Representatives from New York (state)
19th-century American politicians